Nammo, short for Nordic Ammunition Company, is a Norwegian/Finnish aerospace and defence group specialized in production of ammunition, rocket engines and space applications. The company has subsidiaries in Finland, Germany, Norway, Sweden, Switzerland, Spain, Australia, the United Kingdom, the Republic of Ireland, the United States, and Canada. The company is owned 50/50 by the Norwegian government (represented by the Norwegian Ministry of Trade, Industry and Fisheries) and the Finnish defence company Patria. The company has its headquarters in Raufoss, Norway.

The company has five business units: Small Caliber Division, Medium & Large Caliber Division, Missile Products Division, Demil Division and Nammo Defense Systems.

History
Nammo was founded in 1998 by Raufoss (Norway), Patria (Finland), and Celsius (Sweden). The Lapua cartridge factory in Finland is also part of the Nammo group as Nammo Lapua Oy. In 2005, the present joint ownership between Patria and the Norwegian government was established.

In 2007, Nammo acquired the US munitions company, Talley, Inc. after purchasing 100% of its shares. In 2009, it was revealed that the Israeli Defense Forces purchased 28,000 M72 LAWs from Nammo Talley, along with weapons parts and training missiles valued at NOK 600 million. These munitions were later used in Operation Cast Lead. According to Nammo Raufoss administrative director, Lars Harald Lied, the company also produces 12.7mm "multi-purpose" ammunition that was used by both American and Norwegian soldiers in the War in Afghanistan, often in contravention of international law.

In addition to alleged international law violations, the company has also caused controversy in Norway, where laws prohibit Norwegian companies from selling munitions for conflict purposes. Nammo information director, Sissel Solum, alleges that Nammo bears no responsibility for the use of their munitions after purchase, although some claim (including the Norwegian Church Aid and PRIO) that this is a breach of the intended spirit of national export regulations. The company has also been able to circumvent Norwegian laws and avoid prosecution by outsourcing manufacturing to plants in the US, Finland, and Sweden.

Products

Missile propulsion
Nammo produces the following missiles and missile propulsion systems:

AIM-120 AMRAAM
RIM-162 ESSM
IRIS-T (under license)
Exocet
AIM-9 Sidewinder
Penguin
Naval strike missile (the rocket booster)
Ariane 5 (separation and acceleration boosters)

IDAS (interactive defence & attack for submarines)

Orbital launch vehicle
Nammo manufactures separation rocket motors for Ariane 6, and in the past manufactured them for the Ariane 5.

In January 2013, Nammo and the Andøya Rocket Range spaceport announced that they would be "developing an orbital Nanosatellite launch vehicle (NLV) rocket system called North Star that uses a standardized hybrid motor, clustered in different numbers and arrangements, to build two types of sounding rockets and an orbital launcher", able to deliver a   nanosat into polar orbit.

Small caliber ammunition

5.56×45mm NATO
6.5×47mm Lapua
7.62×39mm
7.62×51mm NATO and .308 Winchester
7.62×54mmR/7.62×53mmR
.30-06 Springfield (7.62×63mm)
.338 Lapua Magnum (8.6×70mm)
9×19mm Parabellum

Medium and large caliber ammunition
As of 2018, Nammo produced the following non-exhaustive list of medium and large caliber ammunition:

12.7×99mm (.50 BMG)
12.7×99 mm Raufoss Mk 211 multipurpose
20×102mm
20×139mm
25×137mm
27×145mm
30×113mm
30×173mm
30mm Swimmer (APFSDS-T MK 258 Mod 1)
35×228mm
40×51mm
40×53mm
57mm L/70 3P
120 mm tank ammunition
Propellant charges for artillery and mortars
Artillery shell bodies
Hand grenades
Warheads

Shoulder-fired systems
Nammo has manufactured shoulder-fired systems since the 1960s, with licence production of the M72 LAW beginning at Raufoss in Norway in 1966. In 2007, Nammo acquired the US munitions company, Talley, Inc., after purchasing 100% of its shares. Today Nammo has operations 10 places in the US (Nammo Defense Systems Inc.) and is the only licensed manufacturer of the M72 LAW, with production lines in Raufoss and Mesa, Arizona.

In addition to the M72, Mesa also manufactures the M141 Bunker Defeat Munition for the United States Army, while Nammo’s facilities in Columbus, Mississippi, manufactures ammunition for the SMAW-system for the United States Marine Corps.

Nammo Defense Systems Inc., Mesa, Arizona, was awarded a $498,092,926 firm-fixed-price contract for the full rate production of M72 light assault weapon variants and components for shoulder-launched munitions training systems on December 20, 2021.

Rocket engine consultancy and development
In 2019 Nammo was awarded an ESA contract to initiate development of a reusable rocket engine for the ascent stage of the Heracles lunar lander. The engine may be fed by electrically driven pumps, from low pressure propellant tanks, which may enable in-space refueling.

References

External links
 Nammo Bloodhound hybrid rocket motor, first test firing, 9 December 2014.

Manufacturing companies of Norway
Defence companies of Norway
Defence companies of Finland
Defence companies of Sweden
Spaceflight
Companies established in 1998
Companies based in Oppland
Ammunition manufacturers
1998 establishments in Norway